The Immortal Heart is a 1939 German drama film directed by Veit Harlan and starring Heinrich George. It was based on Walter Harlan's play The Nuremberg Egg and depicts the inventor of the watch, Peter Henlein.

Cast
 Heinrich George as Peter Henlein
 Kristina Söderbaum as Ev
 Paul Wegener as Dr. Schedel
 Raimund Schelcher as Konrad Windhalm
 Michael Bohnen as Martin Behaim
 Paul Henckels as Güldenbeck
 Ernst Legal as Bader Bratvogel
 Eduard von Winterstein as Richter Sixtus Heith
 Franz Schafheitlin as Burghauptmann Zinderl
 Jakob Tiedtke as Schöffe Weihrauch

Production
Production began in July 1938. To recreate Nuremberg as it looked in 1517, the streets were covered with sand and other demodernization took place. 500 Sturmabteilung horsemen took part in medieval costumes. Harlan and Propaganda Minister Joseph Goebbels concurred on some cuts to the finished film.

Citations

References

External links

1939 films
1939 drama films
Films of Nazi Germany
1930s German-language films
German black-and-white films
Films directed by Veit Harlan
German films based on plays
Films set in the 16th century
Films set in the Holy Roman Empire
German drama films
1930s German films